Bossa nova is a style of music.

Bossa Nova or Bossanova may also refer to:

Bossa Nova (dance), a dance form associated with the music

Film and TV
Bossa Nova (film), a 2000 film
Bossa Nova (1964 film), a 1964 film

Music
Bossanova (band), a Canadian band

Albums
Bossa Nova (Shorty Rogers album), 1962
Bossa Nova (Ramsey Lewis album), 1962
Bossa Nova (Bola Sete album), 1962
Bossa Nova: New Brazilian Jazz, 1962 
Bossa Nova (Eddie Harris album), 1963
Bossa Nova U.S.A. (jazz album) Australian album by Dave Brubeck Quartet, 1963
Bossanova (Pixies album), 1990 
Bossa Nova 2001 (pop album) Japanese album by Pizzicato Five, 1993
Bossanova Swap Meet, Atomic Swing, 1994
Bossa Nova (John Pizzarelli album), 2004

Songs
"Bossanova", by Quincy Jones
"Bossanova" by Laibach
"Bossanova" by Estopa
"Bossanova Jazz"	by Lionel Hampton 
"Nova Bossanova"	by Glaxo Babies

Companies
Bossa Nova Robotics, an American robotics startup

See also

 

 

 
 List of bossa nova standards
 Novas Bossas (album) 2008 Brazilian album by Milton Nascimento
 Bossa Nova, Nova Bossa (album) 1963 Brazilian LP by Manfredo Fest
 Nova Bossa Nova (band) Brazilian jazz ensemble
 Father of Bossa Nova